Siphonalia is a genus of sea snails, marine gastropod mollusks in the subfamily Siphonaliinae of the family Buccinidae, the true whelks.

Species
, species with valid names within the genus Siphonalia include:
 † Siphonalia arctata Staadt, 1913 
 † Siphonalia ariejansseni Schnetler, 2001 
 Siphonalia aspersa Kuroda & Habe in Habe, 1961
 † Siphonalia bervillei (Deshayes, 1864)
 Siphonalia borshengjungi K.-Y. Lai, 2019
 Siphonalia callizona Kuroda & Habe in Habe, 1961
 Siphonalia cassidariaeformis (Reeve, 1846)
 Siphonalia concinna A. Adams, 1863
 Siphonalia dilatata J.W. Broomhead, 2001 (homonym of Siphonalia dilatata Suter, 1913)
 Siphonalia fuscolineata (Pease, 1860)
 Siphonalia fusoides (Reeve, 1846)
 Siphonalia hinnulus (A. Adams & Reeve, 1850)
 Siphonalia hirasei Kuroda & Habe in Habe, 1961
 Siphonalia kikaigashimana Hirase, 1908
 Siphonalia kuronoi T. C. Lan & Goto, 2004
 Siphonalia leei S.-Q. Zhang & S.-P. Zhang, 2018
 Siphonalia longirostris Dunker, 1882: synonym of Siphonalia fusoides (Reeve, 1846)
 Siphonalia marybethi Parth, 1996
 Siphonalia mikado Melvill, 1888
 Siphonalia minor S.-Q. Zhang, S.-P. Zhang & C.-Y. Lee, 2021
 Siphonalia modificata (Reeve, 1846)
 Siphonalia morteni Schnetler & M. S. Nielsen, 2018 †
 Siphonalia nanshaensis S.-Q. Zhang & S.-P. Zhang, 2018
 Siphonalia nigrobrunnea C.-Y. Lee & C.-L. Chen, 2010
 Siphonalia pfefferi G. B. Sowerby III, 1900
 Siphonalia pseudobuccinum Melvill, 1888: synonym of Siphonalia modificata (Reeve, 1846) (junior synonym)
 Siphonalia riparia Lozouet, 1999 †
 Siphonalia signum (Reeve, 1846)
 Siphonalia spadicea (Reeve, 1847)
 Siphonalia teres S.-Q. Zhang, S.-P. Zhang & C.-Y. Lee, 2021
 Siphonalia trochulus (Reeve, 1843)
 Siphonalia vanattai Pilsbry, 1905
 Species brought into synonymy
 Siphonalia cassidariaeforme [sic]: synonym of Siphonalia cassidariaeformis (Reeve, 1846)
 Siphonalia clarkei Tenison Woods, 1876: synonym of Tasmeuthria clarkei (Tenison Woods, 1876) (original combination)
 Siphonalia colus A. Adams, 1863: synonym of Siphonalia modificata (Reeve, 1846) (junior synonym)
 Siphonalia dilatata Suter, 1913: synonym of Penion cuvierianus (Powell, 1927)
 Siphonalia elegans Suter, 1917: synonym of Aeneator elegans (Suter, 1917) (original combination)
 Siphonalia hyperodon Pilsbry, 1895: synonym of  Siphonalia mikado Melvill, 1888
 Siphonalia kelletti [sic]: synonym of Kelletia kelletii (Forbes, 1852) (superseded combination)
 Siphonalia laddi MacNeil, 1961: synonym of Manaria kuroharai Azuma, 1960
 Siphonalia longirostris Dunker, 1882: synonym of Siphonalia fusoides (Reeve, 1846)
 Siphonalia lubrica Dall, 1918: synonym of Siphonofusus lubricus (Dall, 1918) (original combination)
 Siphonalia maxima Tryon, 1881: synonym of Penion maximus (Tryon, 1881) (original combination)
 Siphonalia modificatum [sic] : synonym of  Siphonalia modificata (Reeve, 1846)
 Siphonalia nodosa (Martyn, 1784): synonym of Austrofusus glans (Röding, 1798)
 Siphonalia oligostira Tate, 1891: synonym of Penion mandarinus (Duclos, 1832)
 Siphonalia pallida (Broderip & G. B. Sowerby, 1829): synonym of Solenosteira pallida (Broderip & G. B. Sowerby, 1829)
 Siphonalia pfeifferi [sic]: synonym of Siphonalia pfefferi G.B. Sowerby I, 1900
 Siphonalia pseudobuccinum Melvill, 1888: synonym of Siphonalia modificata (Reeve, 1846) (junior synonym)
 † Siphonalia riparia Lozouet, 1999: synonym of † Oligonalia riparia (Lozouet, 1999)
 Siphonalia semiplicata Pilsbry, 1896: synonym of Siphonalia fusoides (Reeve, 1846)
 Siphonalia signa (Reeve, 1846): synonym of Siphonalia signum (Reeve, 1846) (signum is a noun in apposition [meaning flag or banner] and does not agree in gender with the genus it is combined with)
 Siphonalia stearnsii Pilsbry, 1895: synonym of Siphonalia pseudobuccinum Melvill, 1888
 Siphonalia subdilatata T.-C. Yen, 1936: synonym of Neptunea subdilatata (T.-C. Yen, 1936) (original combination)>
 Siphonalia trochula (Reeve, 1846): synonym of Siphonalia trochulus (Reeve, 1846) (wrong gender agreement of specific epithet; trochulus is a noun in apposition)
 Siphonalia turrita Tenison Woods, 1876: synonym of Tasmeuthria clarkei (Tenison Woods, 1876)>
Taxa inquirenda
 Siphonalia commoda A. Adams, 1863 
 Siphonalia conspersa A. Adams, 1863
 Siphonalia corrugata A. Adams, 1863

References

External links
 Adams, A. (1863). On the Japanese species of Siphonalia, a proposed new genus of gasteropodous Mollusca. The Annals and Magazine of Natural History. (3) 11: 202-206

Buccinidae